In enzymology, a 2-alkyn-1-ol dehydrogenase is an enzyme that catalyzes the chemical reaction below:

2-butyne-1,4-diol + NAD+  4-hydroxy-2-butynal + NADH + H+

The two substrates of this enzyme are 2-butyne-1,4-diol and NAD+, whereas its 3 products are 4-hydroxy-2-butynal, NADH, and H+.

This enzyme belongs to the family of oxidoreductases, specifically those acting on the CH-OH group of donor with NAD+ or NADP+ as acceptor. The systematic name of this enzyme class is 2-butyne-1,4-diol:NAD+ 1-oxidoreductase.

References 

EC 1.1.1
NADH-dependent enzymes
Enzymes of unknown structure